Glais is a semi-rural village in Swansea, South Wales. Nant-y-Pal is a stream running through the middle of Glais. It divides the village into two electoral wards: to the north of the stream, Glais is under the Clydach Electoral Ward; to the south, Glais is under the Llansamlet Electoral Ward. The village is shared between the communities of Clydach and Birchgrove. Glais is within the Swansea East UK Parliament constituency and is represented by the Labour MP, Carolyn Harris. 
 The population is a little more than 1,000.

The word 'glais' is one of the Welsh words for stream and is a common element in Welsh place-names. Other locations containing the word glais occur as a composite element referring to a single particular name.

History

In the early 20th Century Glais was a small village boasting a proud religious community with up to four churches of differing denominations, the oldest of which is a Welsh Dissident chapel called Pentwyn and was built in 1834 upon a glacial moraine which itself was called Y Garth. The name plate for Pentwyn was later moved to a new chapel of worship called Seion in 1840 which still exists to the present day.  

In 1881 an Anglican Church, St Pauls, was built on School Road, formally Cefn y Garth, and is still a practicing church in use with local residents for services of worship and other services. A year later in 1882 and on the same road Glais Primary School was opened to the public for children aged under 11 years old. In 1891 a Tabernacl, Welsh Baptist chapel called Peniel, was built on Station Road on the south side of the village and closed in 1999.

Cattle were driven from as far away as Llandeilo and kept in pens until they were collected by their new owners and moved to their new farm, suggesting that Glais might have acted as a commercial hub for the farm trade in the early years of the history of the village.

The village hosted a racecourse sometime during the 19th and 20th centuries but the first known reference is from 1920 for an equestrian event. The facility was amended for pedestrianism and Greyhound Racing in 1928 after the Swansea Corporation decided to not allow Greyhound Racing at St Helen's in Swansea town's centre. By the 1960s, Glais Stadium had been transformed into a general recreational facility with bowling green, tennis courts and sports fields. The earlier stand was retained.

Today, the sports grounds are largely taken up by the 18-hole Tawe Vale Golf Club, a former 9-hole works course developed for use by employees of the INCO Nickel Works (the former Mond Nickel Works) nearby. The bowling green survived.

Their bodies were never recovered and thus they were commemorated on the family headstone in Capel Seion.

Glacial terminal moraine

An example of a glacial moraine in the south of the village is one of over a thousand sites in Wales that are officially designated Sites of Special Scientific Interest. Named Y Garth, it is regarded as "one of the best examples in Wales of such a formation dating from this period" and "has helped geologists reconstruct the environment of Wales at the end of the last Ice Age".

The site is largely undisturbed by industrial human activity apart from an old and disused coal mine with many of the rocks carried from far afield during the last Ice Age is still exposed for scientific study today. There is also an old school present which has since been converted into a bungalow. This has led to the site being protected from development. Due to the large size of the geological feature the River Tawe, Swansea's largest river, is diverted through natural means to the west towards Clydach. The site also contains a natural wall that drops suddenly 130 feet downwards at the front of the moraine due to the material from further up the valley being deposited.

Roads

The B4291 (Birchgrove Road) passes through the centre of the village, providing a route between Clydach and Skewen. Ynysymond Road runs from Glais to Alltwen.

Public transport bus service First Group operate four bus routes through Glais. Routes 61 and 67 operate Monday to Friday which travels to Llansamlet to Swansea College and Clydach to Tycoch College accordingly, while Route 144 travels from Swansea City Centre to Morriston Hospital via Bonymaen, Trallwn, Tesco, Asda and Morriston and Route 145 travels from Swansea City Centre to Morriston but this time via Bonymaen, Tesco, Birchgrove and Clydach. Both of these routes operate from Monday to Saturday. South Wales Transport operates service '213' to one of the local schools: Cwmtawe Community School.

There are nearby Comprehensive Schools: Birchgrove Comprehensive and Cwmtawe Comprehensive. Birchgrove provides free bus travel through private contractors; Cwmtawe pupils pay a small fee.

Glais Rugby Club

Glais Rugby Club was formed in 1896 which along with Trebanos can lay claim to being one of the oldest teams in the Clydach district. Albert Harding, father of former Welsh international and British Lion winger Judge Rowe Harding, is credited as being the pioneer of the village's only and still surviving rugby club much to the opposition of a large group of residents against sport at the time.

Originally playing in green and gold colours this changed to blue and white hoops before finally settling on all blue. At the beginning of its existence Glais was considered a "nomadic" club, playing their home games at several sites including the Mond Field and Garth Field before establishing their home ground permanently at Glais Rugby Field.

In 1912-1913 the club won its first major trophy as champions of the Swansea and District R.U. Challenge Cup, this came after losing out to the second division championship via a play-Off game against Cwmtwrch at Ystalyfera. Estimates place crowd attendance above 3,000 which is far in excess of the population of Glais.

Glais Rugby Club ran out with much success during the 1920s and won several Swansea District titles between 1922 and 1927 which included one fourth division league and cup title, one third division league title, one second division cup title, three first division league titles and one first division cup title. Glais had also finished the 1928 season top of the First Division yet again however this triumph was invalidated after an administration error meant the club had not been registered at the beginning of the 1928 season.

To this day, the club remains an integral part of the Glais community and currently play in the SWALEC Division 5 South West. They enjoy a long and peaceful, yet fiercely competitive, rivalry with Vadre Rugby Club.

Nicholas of Glais

Thomas Evan Nicholas, the famous Welsh poet and radical, known as Niclas y Glais, was a minister at Seion Chapel in Glais between 1904 and 1914. He helped found the Independent Labour Party, supported the coal miners of Glais in the disputes of 1905, 1909–10, and 1911, and was Welsh editor of the Merthyr Pioneer, the ILP newspaper. He opposed WW1, like his close friend Keir Hardie, and in 1918 he stood as the ILP candidate in Merthyr and Aberdare, Hardie's old seat. He was a foundation member of the Communist Party when it was set up in 1920. He is popularly known as Nicholas of Glais and the street Nicholas Road in the same village is named directly after him.

He was famous for poems which concentrated on injustice, the battles between the working class and the power of capital, as well as pacifism.  Arrested in WW2 at the same time as the Communist South Wales Miners leaders, he was not released when the miners went on strike until their leaders were released, but was kept in prison for four months - first in Swansea, then in Brixton. He was denied paper lest he write something to stop the war. They allowed him chalk and a slate. The poems he wrote in Welsh are available in English translations by Dewi Emrys in "Prison Sonnets". The most significant poem there is titled 'Terminus'.  Asked how could a Congregational Minister write such a poem ending ".. give me man's hell, not God's remorseless Heaven," he replied "You must use language people can understand, and, it is only the problems that make Life interesting.

He was subject to injustice under the intense examination of MI5. He was finally released due to lack of evidence.

Greyhound racing
Glais Stadium hosted greyhound racing from 1927 until 1939.

Local media
In 2014, Glais Forum was set up as a Facebook group to keep the villagers of Glais up to date with matters affecting their community. , the group has 900 contributing members.

References

Villages in Swansea